Rivière-Rouge (English translation: Red River) is a city located in the Antoine-Labelle Regional County Municipality, Quebec, Canada. The population as of the 2021 Canadian census was 4,631.

History
As part of the 2000–2006 municipal reorganization in Quebec, the city was created on December 18, 2002 by the amalgamation of the villages of L'Annonciation, La Macaza, Sainte-Véronique, and Canton Marchand. After a referendum in 2004, La Macaza regained its independent status on January 1, 2006 but remains part of the Urban agglomeration of Rivière-Rouge. The urban agglomeration is responsible for managing aspects that are common to all municipalities that were once merged, examples are 911 service, public safety, recycling and many other city functions that were merged into the city. The original villages are now the sectors of L'Annonciation, Marchand, and Sainte-Veronique. Although the city is named Rivière-Rouge, most people still call each town by its historical name.

The city is named for Rouge River that runs through the area. It is a tributary of the Ottawa River (French: Rivière des Outaouais). The region was always known as La Vallee de la Rouge (English: The Valley of the Red), and the city name was probably chosen for this reason. The now defunct local Air cadet squadron number 883 was also called Rivière-Rouge.

The village of l'Annonciation was created in 1908 from the "Downtown" area of the municipality of Marchand, so in one sense it has been re-absorbed into the whole. The two municipalities had done many things in cooperation prior to the merger.

Demographics 

Local government
List of former mayors:
 Déborah Bélanger (2002–2017)
 Denis Charette (2017–2021)
 Denis Lacasse (2021–present)

Transportation

The provincial government has over the years looked into creating a bypass of the Trans-Canada Highway Route 117 that runs through the L'Annonciation sector, in order to alleviate traffic problems caused by a combination of heavy truck traffic, heavy weekend tourist traffic and a main street that was not built for the amount of traffic. The currently planned new route would cut traffic in the downtown L'Annonciation area by an estimated 75%. The road would split off the current highway south of the village and pass the village to the west, and rejoin the main road just to the north near highway 321. There would also be one additional exchange built off the new highway, about half way that would join up to Montée Marois, a street in the center of the village where the only traffic light is. Much of the land acquisition surveying, and clearing has been undertaken over the past two years. It was expected to be completed by the end of 2009, as of 2011 is still under construction.

Services

Hospitals

The city also is home to the regional hospital, Le Centre Hospitalier Des Laurentides (CHDL), which is located in the L'Annonciation sector along the Trans-Canada highway. The hospital is in theory a full service hospital, but each year the provincial health care budget changes considerably and cuts or expansions in services occur. A large portion of the hospital is allocated to the mental ward and to the care of psychiatric patients.

Police
The city does not have a municipal police or public safety force and must rely on the Mont-Laurier precinct of the Sûreté du Québec for police services.

Fire
The city has a volunteer fire department with two fire stations, one serving the Ste-Veronique sector and one serving both the L'Annonciation and Marchand sectors. Prior to the creation of the city, the villages of L'Annonciation and Canton Marchand operated a joint fire department. The city continued to use the same buildings and equipment from the villages.

Education

Commission scolaire Pierre-Neveu (CSPN) operates Francophone schools serving all sectors of Rivière-Rouge. It operates the two public schools in Rivière-Rouge.
 École du Meandre (known as Ecole Ste-Croix before the province of Quebec restructured their school systems) is located in the L'Annonciation sector. The school goes from kindergarten to secondary 3 (9th grade). It serves as the grade school for the L'Annonciation and Marchand sectors as well as the regional junior high school (secondary 1 through 3, or grades 7 through 9) for Rivière-Rouge, La Macaza, L’Ascension, Nominingue, Ste-Veronique, Lac Saguay and unincorporated areas in between.
 École du Christ-Roi, a part of École des Trois Sentiers, is a k-6 grade school located in the Ste-Veronique sector.
 Students must complete their last two years of high school at École Polyvalente St-Joseph in the nearby city of Mont-Laurier.

Saint Agathe Academy of the Sir Wilfrid Laurier School Board in Sainte-Agathe-des-Monts serves English-speaking students in all sectors of Rivière-Rouge.

See also
List of cities in Quebec

References

External links

Cities and towns in Quebec
Incorporated places in Laurentides